William Thomas "Mother" Dunn  (May 13, 1881 – November 17, 1962) was an American college football player who was a linebacker and center for the Penn State Nittany Lions football team of Penn State University.  Dunn captained the 1906 Nittany Lion, and that year became the first player outside of the Ivy League to be selected as an All-American by Walter Camp.  He was also the first great linebacker in the history of Penn State's football program, a school that would eventually be nicknamed "Linebacker U" for its history of excellent play at the linebacker position.

Dunn was featured on the official 2011 Nittany Lion football schedule poster as part of the celebration of 125 years of Penn State football.

External links
"The legacy of Linebacker U" The Daily Collegian, September 2, 2000

1881 births
1962 deaths
All-American college football players
American football linebackers
American football centers
Penn State Nittany Lions football players
Players of American football from Youngstown, Ohio